MS Cruise Ausonia is a fast Ro-Pax jumbo ferry owned by the Grimaldi Lines and sails on the Livorno-Palermo route.  She was built in 2002 for Superfast Ferries as MS Superfast XII by a shipyard in Lübeck, Germany, and is the last vessel of 12. She is a sister ship of Superfast XI.

Superfast XII was on the route Patras–Ancona until March 2009. From March 2009 she operated on the route Piraeus–Heraklion (Crete).From 25 May 2015 she is on route Piraeus-Syros-Patmos-Leros-Kos-Rhodes. Since 2017 she has also been making calls in Kalymnos.

In June 2018 her sale to Grimaldi Group was completed as part of Attica Group takeover of Hellenic Seaways shares from Grimaldi lines.

References

External links
 Superfast Ferries official web site - Greece - Italy / Pireaus - Heraklion
 M/S SUPERFAST XII (2002) photo.
 M/S SUPERFAST XII (2002) photo.
 Superfast XII photo
 Christening of Superfast XII

2001 ships
11
Ships built in Lübeck